Andrew George "Andy" Stroukoff (born April 27, 1950) is an American former competitive ice dancer. With partner Susan Kelley, he represented the United States at the 1976 Winter Olympics, where they placed 17th. They represented the Skating Club of Boston

Following his retirement from skating, he became a coach. Among his current and former students are Cathy Reed & Chris Reed and Maia Shibutani & Alex Shibutani.  He currently teaches figure skating as well as conditioning and training for power skating and hockey skating at the William G. Mennen Sports Arena in Morris Township, New Jersey.

Competitive highlights
(with Kelley)

References

 Sports-reference profile

American male ice dancers
Olympic figure skaters of the United States
Figure skaters at the 1976 Winter Olympics
1950 births
Living people
Sportspeople from Trenton, New Jersey